Alexander Akinduro do Carmo Akingbulugbe (born 6 June 1997), commonly known as Alexander, is a Brazilian footballer of Nigerian descent who most recently played as a defender for Planaltina.

Career statistics

Club

Notes

References

1997 births
Living people
Brazilian people of Nigerian descent
Brazilian footballers
Association football defenders
Kategoria e Parë players
Associação Portuguesa de Desportos players
Colorado Esporte Clube players
União Suzano Atlético Clube players
Brazilian expatriate footballers
Brazilian expatriate sportspeople in Albania
Expatriate footballers in Albania
Footballers from São Paulo